Angel on the Amazon, also known as Drums Along the Amazon, is a 1948 American adventure film directed by John H. Auer and starring George Brent, Vera Ralston, Brian Aherne and Constance Bennett.

Plot summary
After a plane crashes in the Amazonian jungle, its passengers are rescued by a mysterious young woman. They include pilot Jim Warburton, who is fascinated by the woman, Christine Ridgeway, as well as relieved when she and guide Paulo steer him and Karen, a doctor, away from the jungle and its threatening war drums.

Upon reaching Rio de Janeiro safely, Jim and Karen are surprised to encounter Christine again, then shocked when the sight of a strange man causes her to panic. Jim eventually follows the man, who identifies himself as Don Sebastian Ortega and tells a strange tale of how Christine's mother once shot a panther, then killed herself. Christine's father then left her behind.

Jim returns to the United States and finds Anthony Ridgeway, who reveals that Christine is not his daughter but his wife. Jim also eventually learns that Christine has become committed to a sanitarium, where she is now under Karen's care.

Cast
 George Brent as Jim Warburton  
 Vera Ralston as Christine Ridgeway  
 Brian Aherne as Anthony Ridgeway 
 Constance Bennett as Dr. Karen Lawrence 
 Fortunio Bonanova as Sebastian Ortega  
 Alfonso Bedoya as Paulo  
 Gus Schilling as Dean Hartley 
 Richard Crane as Johnny MacMahon  
 Walter Reed as Jerry Adams  
 Ross Elliott as Frank Lane 
 Konstantin Shayne as Dr. Jungmeyer

References

Bibliography
 Kellow, Brian. The Bennetts: An Acting Family. University Press of Kentucky, 2004.

External links
 

1948 films
American adventure films
1948 adventure films
1940s English-language films
Films directed by John H. Auer
Films scored by Nathan Scott
Republic Pictures films
Films set in Brazil
American black-and-white films
1940s American films